Aloha Oe is a 1915 silent film drama produced by Thomas Ince and released by the Triangle Film Corporation. The script was reused in the 1931 film Aloha. It is currently classified as a lost film.

Cast
 Willard Mack - David Harmon
 Enid Markey - Kalaniweo
 Margaret Thompson - Dris Keith
 Frank Borzage -
 J. Frank Burke -
 J. Barney Sherry -
 John Gilbert (uncredited)

References

External links
 
 

1915 films
American silent feature films
Lost American films
Silent American drama films
1915 drama films
American black-and-white films
Films set in Oceania
1915 lost films
Lost drama films
1910s American films